Said Pasha was the Mamluk ruler of Iraq between 1813 and 1816. He was a son of Sulayman Pasha the Great, and was succeeded by Dawud Pasha.

See also
Mamluk dynasty of Iraq

Iraqi pashas
Iraqi people of Georgian descent
Muslims from Georgia (country)
Georgians from the Ottoman Empire